Radiodiscus compactus is a species of small air-breathing land snail, a terrestrial gastropod mollusk in the family Charopidae. This species is endemic to Brazil.

References 

Fauna of Brazil
Radiodiscus
Endemic fauna of Brazil
Gastropods described in 1980
Taxonomy articles created by Polbot